Uncharacterized LOC100507195 is a protein that in humans is encoded by the LOC100507195 gene.

References 

Non-coding RNA